The 2020–21 Botola 2, also known as Botola Pro 2 Inwi for sponsorship reasons, is the 59th season of Botola 2, the second division of the Moroccan football league. The season began on 4 December 2020 and is scheduled to end by the summer of 2021.

Teams

League table

Results

See also
 2020–21 Botola
 2020-21 Moroccan Amateur National Championship

External links
 Soccerway

References

Botola seasons